The Baka Boyz, brothers Nick and Eric Vidal, are American radio personalities, music producers and remixers from Bakersfield, California. The duo first achieved fame on the hip-hop/R&B radio station KPWR (Power 106 FM) in Los Angeles.

Background
The Baka Boyz were originally DJs in Bakersfield, California, before moving south to Los Angeles. They first began at Power 106 in 1992 with their show creation, "Friday Nite Flavas". They also developed Power's live mixing "World Famous Roll Call". After achieving high ratings in the morning and afternoon slots at Power for seven years, the duo grew disaffected with Power's move to R&B, at the expense of hip-hop, and left. Shortly after leaving Power 106 in 1999, the duo briefly had an afternoon show on KKBT. Later, they decided to move north to KMEL in San Francisco. They are hosts of the nationally syndicated "Hip Hop Master Mix", broadcast on over fifty stations nationwide. Finally, the Baka Boyz acted as talent scouts, discovering future LA radio star Big Boy, Dj Eman and Tito among others. In addition, they have also produced tracks for various artists. They produced and co-wrote the track "Scandalous" by Psycho Realm on the 1994 Mi Vida Loca original motion picture soundtrack, "Pistol Grip Pump" by Project Blowed rapper Volume 10, and other tracks.

The Vidals later relocated to WMIB The Beat 103.5 in Miami in March 2003 as the station's morning hosts. But by 2005 The Baka Boyz returned to Los Angeles to do afternoon hosting at 93.5 KDAY. They were there until May 2007, when the Baka Boyz moved to Blazin' 98.9 in San Diego to do their morning show there. The Duo left the station in 2008 and continues to focus on their weekly syndicated Hip-Hop mix show "The Baka Boyz Master Mix." 
The Baka Boyz returned to Los Angeles in 2017 and started "Live From Cybertron" on Dash Radio.  Live From Cybertron was a daily 3 hour show which was heard on Dash Radio.  Live from Cyberton had guest from the EDM scene along with Hip Hop acts.  This show gave birth to "The Most Interesting Mix In The World."
After Live From Cybertron ended, In 2018 The Baka Boyz Moved to a Daily Morning show format on Dash Radio's The City. The morning show saw all kinds of guest stop by, keeping the theme that Live From Cyberton had, but also inviting people from Hollywood.  The Baka Boyz Morning show on The City was streamed on Youtube, Facebook and Twitch for one year before a station remodel happened which lead to the morning show going on a hiatus. 
Currently The Baka Boyz have made their return to Los Angeles FM radio on 93.5 KDAY.  The Hip-Hop Master mix is on every Friday Night from 9pm pst to 12am pst. Two Giant Los Angeles radio Stations are in negotiations to bring back "Baka Boyz Morningz" with Uncle Tito January 4, 2021.

References

External links
2008 MAS Magazine Interview with The Baka Boyz
Hip Hop News: FNV Newsletter, August 2, 1999
The Baka Boyz website biography

American radio personalities
People from Bakersfield, California